George Edward Mannering (31 July 1862 – 29 October 1947), known as Guy Mannering, was a New Zealand banker, mountaineer and writer. He was born in Birch Hill Station, North Canterbury, New Zealand on 31 July 1862. He attended the prep school of Sibella Ross before attending Christ's College.

Bibliography

References

External links

1862 births
1947 deaths
New Zealand bankers
New Zealand mountain climbers
New Zealand writers